The Valea Caselor (also: Sibișel) is a right tributary of the river Sebeș in Romania. It discharges into the Sebeș in Rășinari.

References

Rivers of Romania
Rivers of Sibiu County